Shamsabad (also Romanized as Shamsābād) is a village in Davudabad Rural District, in the Central District of Arak County, Markazi Province, Iran. At the 2006 census, its population was 44, in 14 families.

References 

Populated places in Arak County